Cryptocephalus obsoletus is a species of case-bearing leaf beetle in the family Chrysomelidae. It is found in North America.

Subspecies
These two subspecies belong to the species Cryptocephalus obsoletus:
 Cryptocephalus obsoletus indistinctus R. White, 1968
 Cryptocephalus obsoletus obsoletus Germar, 1824

References

Further reading

 
 
 

obsoletus
Articles created by Qbugbot
Beetles described in 1824